The 2015–16 season of the Oberliga Westfalen, the highest association football league in the Westphalia region of the state of North Rhine-Westphalia, was the fourth season of the league at tier five (V) of the German football league system and the 34th season overall since establishment of the league in 1978. The league went defunct from 2008 to 2012, when it was re-established.

The season began on 14 August 2015 and finished on 29 May 2016.

Standings 
The league featured four new clubs for the 2015–16 season with TSV Marl-Hüls promoted as champions of the Westfalenliga I, SC Paderborn 07 II as champions of the Westfalenliga II and SV Schermbeck in the promotion round of the Westfalenliga runners-up while Sportfreunde Siegen had been relegated from the Regionalliga West.

Top goalscorers
The top goal scorers for the season:

Promotion play-off
The runners-up of the two divisions of the Westfalenliga competed for one more spot in the Oberliga.

|}

References

External links 
  
 Oberliga Westfalen on Fupa.net 

Oberliga Westfalen
Westfalen